The seventh Senate district of Connecticut elects one member of the Connecticut Senate. Its current Senator is Republican John Kissel, who was first elected in 1994. The district is centered on the town of Enfield and also  contains the towns of Suffield, Windsor Locks, East Granby, Somers and parts of Granby and Windsor.

List of representatives

Recent elections

External links
 Google Maps - Connecticut Senate Districts

References

07